Carl Günther Hermann Weiss (April 29, 1915 – April 2, 2000) was a Danish field hockey player who competed in the 1936 Summer Olympics. He was born in Gentofte.

In 1936 he was a member of the Danish team which was eliminated in the group stage of the Olympic tournament. He played both matches as goalkeeper.

External links
 
Carl Günther Weiss' profile at Sports Reference.com

1915 births
2000 deaths
Danish male field hockey players
Olympic field hockey players of Denmark
Field hockey players at the 1936 Summer Olympics
People from Gentofte Municipality
Sportspeople from the Capital Region of Denmark